Vallis Inghirami (latin for Inghirami Valley) is a valley on far side of the Moon which is a natural satellite of planet Earth. Diameter of the valley is about 145 km. Valley is named after Giovanni Inghirami. Valley was approved by IAU in 1964.

See also
 Inghirami crater
 List of lunar features

References

Valleys on the Moon